Lopit may refer to:
Lopit people
Lopit language

Language and nationality disambiguation pages